"Get on Up and Do It Again" is a song by Canadian studio project Suzy Q. The song was written by Jerry Cucuzzella, Giovanni D'Orazio, Sergio Panzera and was produced by the J.C. Records owner Jerry Cucuzzella. The song is also included on their album Get On Up And Do It Again.

The original 1981 version has peaked at number 4 on the Billboard Dance  chart and the second 1982 version at 12 on the same chart.

Composition 
"Get On Up and Do It Again" is a post-disco and dance-pop with a length of five minutes and 54 seconds (original 12" version). It is set in common time and has a moderate tempo of 112 beats per minute.

Track listing

Promotional 12" singles
US single
 "Get On Up Do It Again" (Vocal) (Long Version)  – 5:54
 "Get On Up Do It Again Pt. II" (Vocal) (Short Version)– 3:28

Canadian single
 "Get On Up Do It Again" (Vocal) – 5:54
 "Get On Up Do It Again" (instrumental) – 3:17

Personnel
 Jerry Cucuzzella – producer
Carol Jiani – vocals (uncredited)
Michelle Mills – vocals (second version)

Chart positions

Legacy
The song was featured on the Grand Theft Auto IV in-game radio station called K109 The Studio.
The song was heard in Further Tales of the City.

References 

1982 singles
1981 singles
1981 songs
Atlantic Records singles